In the Kongo language, Abada refers to a mythical animal similar to a unicorn. The Abada, however, has two crooked horns as opposed to a unicorn's single one. The Abada's horns can act as an antidote to poison and disease.

It has been described as being the size of a small donkey with the tail of a boar.

It also appears to those that are lost. 
The Abada is also known as Nillekma or Arase.

References 

 http://www.sacred-texts.com/earth/mm/mm13.htm

Central African legendary creatures
Kongo
Unicorns

Skin by the Sea by Natasha Bowen
page 103.